Maharaja Udit Narayan Singh  was the eldest surviving son of Maharaj Mahip Narayan Singh, Udit Narayan Singh Sahib Bahadur (1770 – 4 April 1835, r. 12 September 1795 – 4 April 1835) became the new king of Benares. He was a nationalist and a benevolent ruler who refused to bow down against the anarchy and corruption of the company. He was even more averse to British dominion than his father and had regular confrontations with the company, who, in spite, falsely labeled him as an incapable administrator. He added grandeur to and formed the present shape of the world famous Ramlila of Ramnager which was a low key affair at that time. He like his father, did not levy taxes on farmers and he established checkpoints which took taxes according to the amount of goods which were taken to the city for selling and trading to encourage trade in finished goods, so as to check the drain of wealth from India. He was loved and revered by his people who established his statue at the Girija Bagh temple in PAC campus Ramnager (which is also a part of Ramlila at Ramnager). Britishers were not able to tolerate him, so conspired against him and under false charges confiscated all the lands of Benaras State and started ruthlessly exploiting the peasants. Unable to spectate it silently, the Maharaja, in 1828, petitioned the company to annul the 1794 agreement under which the Benaras State had lost the sarkars, and to press for their return to state control. However, the company, in accordance with its colonial intent, ordered a sham inquiry into Maharaj Udit Narayan Singh's personal affairs and his governance. As expected, the report backed the false charges of mismanagement. The company, taking advantage of its own fraud, confiscated the last remaining lands of the Maharaja and placed them under their own control which were sold into permanent settlement as Zamindaries. However the Maharaja purchased these Zamindaries (all 96 Parganas) back, from under the table, and had the last laugh. He built the first dam of UP for advancement of agriculture. Maharaja Udit Narayan Singh Saheb Bahadur ascended to Baikunth on 4 April 1835, aged 65, and was succeeded by his adopted son, Maharaja Ishwari Prasad Narayan Singh Sahib Bahadur.

See also
 Benares State

References

1770 births
1835 deaths
Hindu monarchs
19th-century Indian monarchs
Maharajas of Benares
History of Varanasi
Narayan dynasty
Recipients of the Kaisar-i-Hind Medal